is the first full-length album by Animetal the Second, a solo project by anonymous female singer Queen.M. Released through Gr8! Records on March 25, 2015, it is a spiritual continuation of Eizo Sakamoto's cover band Animetal. The album consists of heavy metal covers of popular anime theme songs from the 1990s and 2000s. It also features guest performances by Dokken guitarist George Lynch, Pretty Maids guitarist Ken Hammer, Ratt guitarist Warren DeMartini, Granrodeo guitarist E-Zuka and Loudness members Akira Takasaki and Masayoshi Yamashita.

The album peaked at No. 137 on Oricon's weekly albums chart.

Track listing
All tracks are arranged by Metal Yoity, except tracks 6 and 9 by F.A.B.

Personnel
Queen.M – Lead vocals
Z.Z.T. – All instruments (except where indicated)

with

George Lynch – Guitar (2, 13)
Akira Takasaki – Guitar (3, 14)
E-Zuka – Guitar (4, 15)
Toru Meki – Guitar (5)
Ken Hammer – Guitar (6, 10)
Metal Pool – Guitar (6, 9)
Warren DeMartini – Guitar (7)
Matsu – Guitar (11)
Dual Guy – Guitar (12)
Masayoshi Yamashita – Bass (3, 12, 14)
Tak Arama – Bass (5, 11)
Metal Yoity – Bass (6, 9), guitar (9)
F.A.B. – all instruments (6, 9)

Charts

References

External links

2015 debut albums
Animetal albums
Japanese-language albums
Covers albums
Sony Music Entertainment Japan albums